Juan de Valdés Leal (4 May 1622 – 15 October 1690) was a Spanish painter and etcher of the Baroque era.

Career
Valdés was born in Seville in 1622. He became a painter, sculptor, and architect. By his twenties, he was studying under Antonio del Castillo in Córdoba.

Among his works are History of the Prophet Elias for the church of the Carmelites; Martyrdom of St. Andrew for the church of San Francesco in Córdoba; and Triumph of the Cross for la Caridad in Seville.  He became friends with Bartolomé Esteban Murillo, who had a very different style; Leal tended to paint somber and dramatic subjects, while Murillo's style was peaceful and serene. After Leal returned to Seville in 1656, he and Murillo founded the Seville Academy of Art.

Several of his paintings treat the subjects of vanitas, transience and mortality.  Two examples are In ictu oculi ("in the blink of an eye") and Finis gloriae mundi ("end of the world's glory"), painted for the Charity Hospital in Seville.

Life
He married Isabella Carasquilla in 1647. She was also a painter. He and his wife had five children, several of whom were also artists: Lucas, Juan, Maria, and Laura. His daughters specialized in portrait miniatures. Valdés died in Seville in 1690. His wife died in Seville as late as 1730.  Maria died a nun in the Cistercian Convent in Seville in 1730.

References

Further reading

External links
Juan de Valdés Leal Paintings at Art Renewal Center
Juan de Valdés Leal su Artcyclopedia
Scholarly articles about Juan Valdés Leal both in web and PDF @ the Spanish Old Masters Gallery

1622 births
1690 deaths
Painters from Seville
17th-century Spanish painters
Spanish male painters
Spanish Baroque painters
Male painters
Catholic painters
Catholic etchers
Catholic sculptors